The 2010 India Grand Prix was a badminton tournament that was held at Kotla Vijay Bhaskar Reddy Indoor Stadium in Hyderabad, Andhra Pradesh, India from 14 to 19 December 2010 and had a total purse of $50,000. This tournament was moved from Lucknow to Hyderabad, allegedly due to the infighting in the Badminton Association of India.

Men's singles

Seeds

 Dionysius Hayom Rumbaka (champion)
 Chetan Anand (third round)
 Parupalli Kashyap (semi-finals)
 Alamsyah Yunus (semi-finals)
 Ajay Jayaram (third round)
 Andre Kurniawan Tedjono (withdrew)
 Arvind Bhat (quarter-finals)
 R. M. V. Gurusaidutt (first round)

Finals

Women's singles

Seeds

 Saina Nehwal (withdrew)
 Maria Febe Kusumastuti (withdrew)
 Adriyanti Firdasari (withdrew)
 Jeanine Cicognini (withdrew)
 Fransisca Ratnasari (final)
 Aditi Mutatkar (withdrew)
 Nitchaon Jindapol (first round)
 Trupti Murgunde (first round)

Finals

Men's doubles

Seeds

 Gan Teik Chai / Tan Bin Shen (final)
 Mohammad Ahsan / Bona Septano (champion)
 Liu Yi / Terry Yeo (second round)
 Ricky Karanda Suwardi / Agripinna Prima Rahmanto Putra (semi-finals)

Finals

Women's doubles

Seeds

 Anneke Feinya Agustin / Annisa Wahyuni (semi-finals)
 Suci Rizky Andini / Della Destiara Haris (semi-finals)
 Ng Hui Ern / Ng Hui Lin (final)
 Gebby Ristiyani Imawan / Tiara Rosalia Nuraidah (quarter-finals)

Finals

Mixed doubles

Seeds

 Patiphat Chalardchaleam / Savitree Amitrapai (second round)
 Arun Vishnu / Aparna Balan (quarter-finals)
 Irfan Fadhilah / Weni Anggraini (quarter-finals)
 Pranav Chopra / Prajakta Sawant (quarter-finals)

Finals

References

External links
 Tournament Link

Syed Modi International Badminton Championships
India
India Grand Prix
India Grand Prix
Sports competitions in Hyderabad, India